During World War II, Operation Samwest (5–12 June 1944) was a large raid conducted by 116 Free French paratroops of the 4th Special Air Service Regiment. Their objective was to hinder movement of German troops from west Brittany to the Normandy beaches via ambush and sabotage attempts.

The first phase of the mission was to establish a secure base on the Breton Peninsula, near St. Brieuc in Duault in the Bretagne Region.  Their base was heavily attacked by German troops on 12 June and they were forced to disperse.

See also

 Operation Dingson
 Operation Cooney
 Operation Lost

References

Airborne operations of World War II
Special Air Service
Operation Overlord
World War II British Commando raids